Devario is a genus of fish in the family Cyprinidae native to the rivers and streams of South and Southeast Asia. These fishes have short barbels and many species having vertical or horizontal stripes. These species consume various small, aquatic insects, crustaceans and worms, as well as, in the case of fry, plankton.

Species
Currently, 43 species in this genus are recognized:

 Devario acrostomus (F. Fang & Kottelat, 1999)
 Devario acuticephala (Hora, 1921)
 Devario aequipinnatus (McClelland, 1839) (Giant danio)
 Devario affinis (Blyth, 1860)
 Devario annandalei (Chaudhuri, 1908)
 Devario anomalus Conway, Mayden & Tang, 2009
 Devario apogon (Chu, 1981)
 Devario apopyris (F. Fang & Kottelat, 1999)
 Devario assamensis (Barman, 1984)
 Devario auropurpureus (Annandale, 1918)
 Devario browni (Regan, 1907)
 Devario chrysotaeniatus (Chu, 1981)
 Devario deruptotalea Ramananda & Vishwanath, 2014
 Devario devario (F. Hamilton, 1822) (Bengal danio)
 Devario fangae Kullander, 2017
 Devario fangfangae (Kottelat, 2000)
 Devario fraseri (Hora, 1935) (Fraser's danio)
 Devario gibber (Kottelat, 2000)
 Devario horai (Barman, 1983)
 Devario interruptus (Day, 1870)
 Devario kakhienensis (J. Anderson, 1879)
 Devario kysonensis (Nguyễn, Nguyễn & Mùa, 2010)
 Devario laoensis (Pellegrin & Fang, 1940)
 Devario leptos (F. Fang & Kottelat, 1999)
 Devario maetaengensis (F. Fang, 1997) (Fire bar danio)
 Devario malabaricus (Jerdon, 1849) (Malabar danio)
 Devario manipurensis (Barman, 1987)
 Devario memorialis Sudasinghe, Pethiyagoda & Meegaskumbura, 2020 (Aranayake devario)
 Devario myitkyinae Kullander, 2017 
 Devario naganensis (Chaudhuri, 1912)
 Devario neilgherriensis (Day, 1867) (Nilgiri danio)
 Devario ostreographus (McClelland, 1839)
 Devario pathirana (Kottelat & Pethiyagoda, 1990) (Barred danio)
 Devario peninsulae (Smith, 1945)
 Devario regina (Fowler, 1934) (Queen danio)
 Devario salmonata (Kottelat, 2000)
 Devario shanensis (Hora, 1928) 
 Devario sondhii (Hora & Mukerji, 1934)
 Devario spinosus (Day, 1870)
 Devario strigillifer (Myers, 1924)
 Devario suvatti (Fowler, 1939)
 Devario xyrops F. Fang & Kullander, 2009 (Blue moon danio)
 Devario yuensis (Arunkumar & Tombi Singh, 1998)

References

 
Freshwater fish genera
Taxa named by Johann Jakob Heckel